In mathematics, the sinhc function appears frequently in papers about optical scattering, Heisenberg spacetime and hyperbolic geometry. For , it is defined as

It is a solution of the following differential equation:

Properties 
The first-order derivative is given by

The Taylor series expansion isThe Padé approximant is

In terms of other special functions 
 , where  is Kummer's confluent hypergeometric function.
 , where  is the biconfluent Heun function.
 , where  is a Whittaker function.

Gallery

See also
Tanc function
Tanhc function
Sinhc integral
Coshc function

References

Special functions